Julius von Blaas (1845–1923) was an Italian painter, the second son of Karl,  born at Albano, Italy.  He studied under his father, devoted himself principally to equestrian subjects, and went to Rome where he painted genre scenes from the Campagna.  His "Race of Intoxicated Slavonic Peasants" (1869) is in the Imperial Museum of Vienna, as is "Antlassritt" (1899).  Julius von Blaas was much employed by the Austrian court as a portrait painter and became professor in the Academy of Vienna.

Paintings
 "Fox Hunt in the Campagna" (1877)
 "Market in Upper Hungary" (1885)
 "Horse Fair in Bischofshofen"''' (1888)
 "Morning Training in the Winter Riding School"'' (1890)

External links
 Artnet.com entry
 

18th-century Austrian painters
18th-century Austrian male artists
Austrian male painters
19th-century Austrian painters
19th-century Austrian male artists
19th-century Italian painters
Italian male painters
20th-century Italian painters
Spanish Riding School
1845 births
1923 deaths
Academic staff of the Academy of Fine Arts Vienna
Italian people of Austrian descent
19th-century Italian male artists
20th-century Italian male artists